The swimming competition at the 2021 Islamic Solidarity Games was held in Konya, Turkey from 13 to 17 August 2022 in Konya Olympic Swimming Pool. The Para Swimming competitions will be organized on 7–11 August 2022 at the Konya Olympic Swimming Pool.

The Games were originally scheduled to take place from 20 to 29 August 2021. In May 2020, the Islamic Solidarity Sports Federation (ISSF), who are responsible for the direction and control of the Islamic Solidarity Games, postponed the games as the 2020 Summer Olympics were postponed to July and August 2021, due to the global COVID-19 pandemic.

Medal table

Medal summary

Men

Women

Para swimming

Medal table

Men

Women

Participating nations

Swimming 
197 swimmers from 36 countries participated:

Para swimming

References

External links 
Official website
Results
Results book – Swimming
Results book – Para Swimming

2021
Islamic Solidarity Games
2021 Islamic Solidarity Games
2021 Islamic Solidarity Games